These Humble Machines is a compilation album by American electronic musician BT, composed of edited versions of songs from his album These Hopeful Machines. Released on April 26, 2011, the album was released with the intention of making the album more accessible for newer listeners while still displaying the same technical prowess found in its predecessor. The album features some radio edits ("Suddenly", "Always") while also liberally using splice editing and fade-outs to edit down songs ("The Emergency", "Every Other Way", "Le nocturne de lumière").

Track listing

Personnel
 Track 1: Vocals by BT and Christian Burns
 Track 2: Vocals by BT. Background vocals by Christian Burns.
 Track 3: Vocals by JES. Background vocals by BT and Christian Burns.
 Track 4: Vocals by JES.
 Track 6: Vocals by BT. Background vocals by Christian Burns. 
 Track 7: Vocals by Kirsty Hawkshaw. Background vocals by BT.
 Track 8: Vocals by BT. Background vocals by Christian Burns.
 Track 9, 11: Vocals by Rob Dickinson.
 Track 12: Vocals by BT. Background vocals by Amelia June.

References

External links
 

2011 compilation albums
BT (musician) compilation albums